Arachis batizocoi  is a herb native to Bolivia and Paraguay. This plant is cited as gene sources for research in plant biology of peanut (Arachis hypogaea). Arachis batizocoi maintains a divergent genome as well as high fertility that facilitates the upbringing of new and beneficial alleles within peanut crops. Such high crossability has increased the frequency of several advantageous alleles that have improved plant life and agricultural output. Among these are boosted resistance against groundnut yield-limiting diseases such as late leaf spot (LLS) and groundnut rosette disease (GRD), larger seeds, and a higher overall yield.

External links
International Legume Database & Information Service: Arachis batizocoi
Quantitative Trait Analysis Shows the Potential for Alleles from the Wild Species Arachis batizocoi and A. duranensis to Improve Groundnut Disease Resistance and Yield in East Africa
Arachis batizocoi: a study of its relationship to cultivated peanut (A. hypogaea) and its potential for introgression of wild genes into the peanut crop using induced allotetraploids

batizocoi
Flora of Bolivia
Flora of Paraguay